Teloleuca is a genus of shore bugs in the family Saldidae. There are about five described species in Teloleuca.

Species
These five species belong to the genus Teloleuca:
 Teloleuca altaica Vinokurov, 2009
 Teloleuca bifasciata (Thomson, 1871)
 Teloleuca branczikii (Reuter, 1891)
 Teloleuca kusnezowi Lindberg, 1934
 Teloleuca pellucens (Fabricius, 1779)

References

Further reading

 
 

Articles created by Qbugbot
Heteroptera genera
Saldidae